Region of Waterloo Paramedic Services (ROWPS) is the emergency medical service provider for the Regional Municipality of Waterloo. The service provides both advanced and primary care level paramedic services to the cities of Waterloo, Ontario, Cambridge, Ontario and Kitchener, Ontario and the townships of Wilmot, Woolwich, Wellesley and North Dumfries.

Staff

Region of Waterloo Paramedic Services employs 280 primary and advanced care paramedics and support staff.

Fleet 
  66 vehicles including:
 48 ambulances
 4 Supervisor Emergency Response Vehicles (ERVs)
 4 First response emergency response units (RERU's)
 1 Operations Support - Multi-Casualty Incident (MCI) Truck with a trailered UTV for off road/multi-terrain response
 2 Community Paramedic Vehicles
 2 Logistics and Support Vehicles
 2 MCI Trailers 
 3 Administrative Support Vehicles

Operations

ROWPS operates from 13 stations within the Region and serves a population of approximately 630,000. ROWPS also provides service to neighbouring areas (such as Oxford, Perth, Wellington and Brant Counties) when ambulances in those municipalities are not available to respond.

 Headquarters – 120 Maple Grove Road, Cambridge
 Breslau – 51 Beacon Point ct. (Station 12)
 Cambridge South – 91 St. Andrews Street 
 Cambridge North – Pinebush Road
 Kitchener Downtown – 100 Water Street North
 Kitchener East – 1035 Ottawa Street North (also Kitchener Fire Station #3) 
 Kitchener West – 1700 Queens Boulevard (also Kitchener Fire Station #5) 
 Kitchener South – Conestoga College Campus, Conestoga College Boulevard
 North Dumfries Township (Ayr) – 501 Scott Street
 Waterloo – 90 Westmount Road
 Waterloo – 1001 Erb's Rd (Station 14)
 Wilmot Township (Philipsburg) – 2001 Nafziger Road, Wilmot
 Woolwich Township (St. Jacobs) – 30 Parkside Drive

See also

Paramedicine in Canada
List of EMS Services in Ontario
Paramedics in Canada
Emergency Medical Services in Canada

Emergency services in Waterloo Region
Waterloo Regional Police Service
Kitchener Fire Department

References

 Emergency Medical Services

Waterloo
Regional Municipality of Waterloo